Saga Prefectural Chienkan Junior & Senior High School is both a junior and senior high school and is located in Saga City, Saga Prefecture, Japan. It was awarded the title of Super Science High School in Japan.

History 
Chienkan High School is made up of two schools:
 Chienkan Senior High School
 Cheinkan Junior High School

Chienkan Senior High School 

On March 27, 1987, the site for Chienkan was purchased from the Saga Prefectural Estate Development Public Corporation. Building of the school was completed in March 1988 and the school was officially established on April 1, 1988. On April 8, Chienkan celebrated its opening and entrance ceremony. The first principal of Chienkan was Mr. Uchikawa Kazumi1.

Chienkan Junior High School 
Chienkan Junior High School was established on December 1, 2002. Mr. Morinaga Kazuo was appointed as the first principal. The official opening of Chienkan J.H.S. was on April 1, 2003.

School name 
In the years preceding the Meiji Restoration, Japan was populated by a multitude of clans. Within this feudal society, the Saga Clan prospered. Its people set up a number of schools to lead the way in the great changes that would soon sweep Japan.

One of these schools was called "Chienkan". In 1867, Nabeshima Naomasa, lord of the Saga Clan, founded Chienkan in Nagasaki. Nabeshima's graduates played an important role in the political and economic backdrop to the Meiji revolution, and considered it their urgent business to implement Western thoughts and sciences in Japan.

So the original Chienkan School became a place for progressive Western learning, especially that of the English language. Many ambitious young people were drawn to this exciting academic center, where they studied subjects from technology to economics to legislation.

The word "Chien" has several meanings: "To make one's ambition lofty." "To invite people from distant places." "To go far." "Chien" is a noble and evocative word. It conjures images of adventure and discovery, of progress and innovation.

Today's Chienkan strives to actualize the values embodied in its name. The school believes that the dreams and ambitions of the first Chienkan School can be found in its namesake, and are more pertinent than ever. The name was chosen because the school hopes that it will continue the proud tradition of that name far into the future1.

School mottos 
Cultivate: Cultivate your mind.
Create:    Create your own self.
Challenge: Challenge your limits.

School badge 
The Kanji, 高, at the center of the school badge means a senior high school and the five redial C's around it are the initials of "Cultivate", "Create", "Challenge", "Character" and "Cosmopolitanism".

Alumni

Location 
map to Chienkan (in Japanese)
Address (English): 1092-1 Fujinoki, Hyogo-machi, Saga-shi, Saga-ken, Japan 849-0915

See also
List of high schools in Japan

References 
1. Saga Prefectural Chienkan Senior High School (Prospectus): General Survey of Chienkan, 2006 (History & School Name)

External links
Chienkan Website - in Japanese
Mext Super High School program (in Japanese)
List of SSH's.

High schools in Saga Prefecture
Schools in Saga Prefecture
Educational institutions established in 1988
1988 establishments in Japan